The Dr. William E. Murphey House was a historic residence near Trinity, Alabama, United States. The house was built around 1824 by George Murphey, a settler from North Carolina.  The house eventually passed to his son, William.  It was a Tidewater cottage with a hall and parlor layout, common in Murhpey's native North Carolina but rare in North Alabama.  The house was listed on the National Register of Historic Places in 1986.  It was destroyed by a tornado on April 27, 2011.

References

National Register of Historic Places in Morgan County, Alabama
Houses completed in 1824
Buildings and structures demolished in 2011
Houses in Morgan County, Alabama
Demolished buildings and structures in Alabama
Tidewater-type cottage architecture in Alabama
Buildings and structures destroyed by tornado